Aaron Sason may refer to:
Aaron ben Isaac Sason (born 1629), Jewish Ottoman author and Talmudist
Aaron ben Joseph Sason, Jewish Ottoman author and Talmudist